TSV St. Johann is an Austrian football club located in St Johann im Pongau, a town in the state of Salzburg in the west of the country. They currently play in the Regionalliga Salzburg, the third tier of Austrian football.

See also 

 Football in Austria
 Austrian Regional League West

External links 

 

St. Johann
Association football clubs established in 1949
1949 establishments in Austria